Champfleury is the pen name of French writer Jules François Felix Fleury-Husson.

Champfleury may also refer to:
 Champfleury, Aube, a French commune
 Champfleury, Marne, a French commune